Volcán Ecuador is the smallest of six shield volcanoes comprising Isabela Island of the Galápagos with an elevation of . It contains a caldera that is breached to the west by edifice collapse. The caldera floor is largely covered by youthful lava flows and contains several chains of spatter cones and small scoria cones.

Volcán Ecuador is the only volcano on Isabela Island not known to have erupted in historical times. However, the geomorphology of its youngest lava flows is comparable to those of very recent lava flows from other volcanoes on Isabela Island. Like Volcán Wolf to the east, Volcán Ecuador straddles on the equator. It is also the only volcano on the island without its own native Galápagos tortoise population.

See also
List of volcanoes in Ecuador

References

Volcanoes of the Galápagos Islands
Shield volcanoes of Ecuador
Polygenetic shield volcanoes
Calderas of the Galápagos Islands